It's After the End of the World (subtitled Live at the Donaueschingen and Berlin Festivals) is a live album by American composer, bandleader and keyboardist Sun Ra recorded in 1970 in Donaueschingen and Berlin and released on the MPS label in 1970. The complete concerts were released in 1998 as a 2-CD set entitled Black Myth/Out in Space.

Reception

Allmusic awarded the album 3 stars. All About Jazz observed "this gem ideally captures Sun Ra and His Intergalactic (Research) Arkestra at its most otherworldly self. ...such a recording as this offers the next best thing to but a sampling of what it must have been like to experience the path that Ra offered his listeners in a live concert, perhaps the most uninhibited platform for his musical message".

Track listing
All compositions by Sun Ra
 "Strange Dreams – Strange Worlds – Black Myth / It's After the End of the World" – 14:40
 "Black Forest Myth" – 9:15
 "Watusi, Egyptian March" – 2:48
 "Myth Versus Reality (The Myth-Science Approach) / Angelic Proclamation / Out in Space" – 18:22
 "Duos" – 4:42

Personnel
Sun Ra – Farfisa organ, Hohner clavinet, piano, Rocksichord, Spacemaster organ, Minimoog, Hohner electra, vocals
Kwame Hadi – trumpet
Akh Tal Ebah – mellophone, trumpet
John Gilmore – tenor saxophone, percussion
Marshall Allen – alto saxophone, flute, oboe, piccolo, percussion
Pat Patrick – baritone saxophone, tenor saxophone, alto saxophone, clarinet, bass clarinet, flute, drum
Danny Davis – alto saxophone, flute, clarinet
Abshalom Ben Shlomo – alto saxophone, flute, clarinet
Danny Ray Thompson – baritone saxophone, alto saxophone, flute
Leroy Taylor – oboe, bass clarinet
Robert Cummings – bass clarinet
Augustus Browning – English horn
Alan Silva – violin, viola, cello, bass
Alejandro Blake Fearon – bass
Lex Humphries – drums
James Jackson – percussion, oboe, flute
Nimrod Hunt – hand drums
Hazoume – fireeater, dance, African percussion
Math Samba, Ife Tayo – dance, percussion
June Tyson – vocals 
Richard Wilkinson – stereo light-sound coordination

References

1970 live albums
MPS Records live albums
Sun Ra live albums